La Rosière or Rosiere may refer to:

Places
 La Rosière, Haute-Saône, a commune in Franche-Comté, France
 La Rosière, Savoie, a ski resort in Montvalezan, France
 Rosiere, Wisconsin, United States

Other uses
 Walter of Rosières (died c. 1273), French knight
 La Rosiere de Pessac (1968 and 1979), two films directed by Jean Eustache
 La Rosière de Salency, a 1769 three-act comedy by Charles-Simon Favart

See also 
 
 Rosières (disambiguation)